Obsidian (also entitled The Obsidian Murders) is the third novel in Thomas King's DreadfulWater mysteries. The novel, published in early 2020, is his fourth novel about an investigator named Thumps DreadfulWater.

The Vancouver Sun listed it with 29 other bestselling books.

In his review published in the Seattle Post-Intelligencer, Richard Marcus wrote:

Plot

As DreadfulWater investigates the murder of a Reality TV producer he begins to suspect he is investigating a murderer who killed his girlfriend, years ago.

References

2020 Canadian novels
Canadian mystery novels
Novels by Thomas King (novelist)
HarperCollins books